Al-Zahiriyah Madrasa is a 13th-century madrasah complex in Aleppo, Syria.

See also
 Al-Firdaws Madrasa
 Al-Sultaniyah Madrasa
 Al-Uthmaniyah Madrasa
 Ancient City of Aleppo
 Khusruwiyah Mosque

References

Buildings and structures completed in the 13th century
Ayyubid architecture in Syria
Madrasas in Aleppo